Dawa Chaffa is a district located in the Oromia Zone of the Amhara region of Ethiopia.  Dawa Chaffa is bordered on the south by Artuma Fursi, on the southwest by the Semien Shewa Zone, on the northwest by the Debub Wollo Zone, on the northeast by the Argobba special woreda, and on the east by Dawa Harewa. Towns in Dawa Cheffa include Welede. Dawa Chaffa was part of former Chaffa Gola Dewerahmedo woreda. The town of Kamisee is surrounded by Dawa Chaffa.

Demographics
Based on the 2007 national census conducted by the Central Statistical Agency of Ethiopia (CSA), this woreda has a total population of 133,388, of whom 66,746 are men and 66,642 women; 2,876 or 2.16% are urban inhabitants. The majority of the inhabitants were Muslim, with 98.73% reporting that as their religion, while 1.1% of the population said they practiced Ethiopian Orthodox Christianity.

Notes

Districts of Amhara Region